Psilocybe congolensis is a species of mushroom-forming fungus in the family Hymenogastraceae.  It is the only psilocybin mushroom known from the Congo, Africa.  It was described as new to science in 2013.

See also
List of Psilocybin mushrooms

References

congolensis
Entheogens
Psychoactive fungi
Psychedelic tryptamine carriers
Fungi of Africa
Taxa named by Gastón Guzmán
Fungi described in 2013